Route 314 is a state highway in central Connecticut running entirely within Wethersfield.

Route description
Route 314 begins at an interchange from US 5 and Route 15 in northwest Wethersfield. It briefly heads north as part of the Berlin Turnpike, then turns east onto Jordan Lane, passing under US 5 and Route 15 again without an interchange, before ending at an intersection with Route 99.  The section of Route 314 from SR 543 to the eastern terminus is designated the Antranig Ozanian Memorial Highway.

History
Route 314 was commissioned in 1963 from portions of SR 543 (Berlin Turnpike north of US 5/Route 15) and SR 759 (Jordan Lane), and has had no significant changes since.

Junction list

References

External links

314
Transportation in Hartford County, Connecticut